David Rollo (26 August 1891 – 17 February 1963) was an Ireland (IFA) international footballer.

Club career
Rollo played his football in Northern Ireland and Wales with Brantwood, Cliftonville, Distillery, West End, Mountpottinger and Linfield, before joining English side Blackburn Rovers for a £2,000 fee in December 1919. Predominantly a half-back, he was nevertheless played at right-back at Ewood Park following the retirement of Bob Crompton. He left Rovers for Second Division club Port Vale in August 1927, and made his debut in a 2–2 draw with Nottingham Forest at The Old Recreation Ground on 27 August. He only played one further game in 1927–28 and did not feature in 1928–29, before he was given a free transfer in May 1929. He later moved on to Fleetwood Windsor Villa.

International career
Rollo earned sixteen caps for Ireland between 1912 and 1926.

Career statistics

Club statistics
Source:

International statistics

References

1891 births
1963 deaths
Association footballers from Belfast
Irish association footballers (before 1923)
Pre-1950 IFA international footballers
Association football midfielders
Association football fullbacks
Brantwood F.C. players
Cliftonville F.C. players
Lisburn Distillery F.C. players
West End F.C. players
Linfield F.C. players
Blackburn Rovers F.C. players
Port Vale F.C. players
NIFL Premiership players
English Football League players